Aatank (English:Terror) is a 1996 Indian Bollywood action thriller written by Sachin Bhowmick and directed by duo Prem Lalwani & Desh Mukherjee. The film stars Dharmendra, Hema Malini, Vinod Mehra in the lead roles. The film began principal photography in the mid-1980s and was delayed for several years before being released in 1996. A sub-plot with a killer shark may have been inspired by the Hollywood film Jaws.

By the time of its release, two of its cast members, Vinod Mehra and Amjad Khan, had died. Most of the movie features a younger Dharmendra and Hema Malini, but one scene features the same actors when they were older, resulting in a continuity error. The dubbing for Amjad Khan's voice was done by a mimic artist, since he had died.

Plot
Jesu and Peter are childhood friends who live in a coastal village in India and depend on fishing as their livelihood. The community is oppressed by a powerful gangster named Alphonso. Jesu is an orphan, while Peter is brought up by his aunt and uncle, after the death of his mother. The community is all thrilled when Phillips finds black pearls off the coast.

But then so does Alphonso, who asks his divers to get all the pearls, thus disturbing the ocean. Peter meets with Suzy D'Silva and they fall in love with each other, and get married. While enjoying a quiet swim on the sea-shore, Suzy disappears. A search is carried out, and a number of human body parts are recovered. With shock and horror, this community finds that their livelihood is being threatened by a gigantic man-eating shark.

Cast 
Dharmendra as Jesu
Hema Malini as Jesu's Girlfriend
Vinod Mehra as Peter
Nafisa Ali as Suzy D' Silva
Girish Karnad as Inspector Khan
Ravi Kissen as Mahesh Kumar
Padma Khanna as Rosy Crasto
Ranjeet as Ranjeet
Kader Khan as D'Costa
Amjad Khan as Alphonso
Disco Shanti as Dancer

Songs
Songs were written by Dev Kohli and Rani Malik.

References

External links
 
 

1996 films
1990s Hindi-language films
1996 action thriller films
Indian action thriller films
Films scored by Laxmikant–Pyarelal
Films about shark attacks
Films about sharks
Underwater action films